Bobotago (Bobotagho) is a village in Sughd Region, northern Tajikistan. It is part of the Jamoat, Guli Surkh in the city of Istaravshan.

References

Populated places in Sughd Region